Kulata is a village in Petrich Municipality, Blagoevgrad Province, in southwestern Bulgaria.  it has 892 inhabitants and the mayor is Dimitar Manolev. The village is a major border checkpoint on the border with Greece. The community of Promachonas in Serres regional unit lies across the border.

The first-class European route E79 and the railway from Sofia to Thessaloniki pass through the village. It will be an important stop on the Struma motorway.

Villages in Blagoevgrad Province
Bulgaria–Greece border crossings